Eldorado Springs is an extinct town in Benton County, in the U.S. state of Arkansas.

History
A variant name was "Eldorado".  Eldorado had its start in the 1880s, centered around a mineral spa.

References

Geography of Benton County, Arkansas
Ghost towns in Arkansas